Prendes is a surname. Notable people with the surname include:

Alejandro Prendes Reina, Spanish association footballer
Carlos Prendes, Mexican canoeist
Eloy José Olaya Prendes, Spanish association footballer
Evaristo Prendes, Argentine fencer
Ignacio Prendes, Spanish politician
Juan Prendes, Cuban handball player
Juan Díaz Prendes, Spanish association footballer
Luis Prendes, Spanish actor
Mercedes Prendes, Spanish actress
Robin Prendes, American rower
Sergio Prendes, Spanish association footballer

See also
Priendes